Terry M. Moe (born June 25, 1949) is the William Bennett Munro professor of political science at Stanford University, a senior fellow at Stanford University's Hoover Institution, and a member of the Hoover Institution’s Koret Task Force on K-12 Education.  Moe is a political scientist, an education scholar, and a bestselling author. He has a B.A. in Economics from the University of California, San Diego, and a Ph.D. in Political Science from the University of Minnesota.

Academic work
Moe has written and spoken extensively on the politics and reform of American education. In his latest book, Special Interest: Teachers Unions and America’s Public Schools (Brookings Institution Press], 2011), he profiles America's teachers unions, tracking their historical rise to power, the organizational foundations of that power, the ways it is exercised in collective bargaining and politics, and its consequences for schools and kids. Moe argues that the teachers unions are the most powerful force in American education—and he argues that this is the key to understanding why, after more than a quarter century of costly education reform, the nation’s schools have proven so resistant to change and so difficult to improve. "Special Interest" received glowing praise from former NYC Schools Chancellor Joel Klein, former Chancellor of Washington, D.C., Public Schools Michelle Rhee, and others, but was strongly criticized by education historian Richard Kahlenberg and The New Republic'''s Jonathan Chait.

As a political scientist, Moe has written on public bureaucracy, the presidency, and political institutions more generally. Moe was an early proponent (during the 1980s and into the 1990s) of putting the analytics of institutional theory to use in transforming the study of public bureaucracy and the presidency, and was instrumental in bringing significant progress to both fields.

Moe began his career in 1976 as an assistant professor of political science at Michigan State University, where he soon published his first book, The Organization of Interests (University of Chicago Press, 1980), which explored the organizational foundations of political interest groups. In 1981, he left for Stanford University, where he has been a member of its political science faculty ever since.

He took leave from Stanford from 1984–86 to be a senior fellow at the Brookings Institution in Washington, D.C. There he engaged in collaborative work with John Chubb on what became Politics, Markets, and America's Schools (Brookings Institution Press, 1990) – a book that, in showing how politics shapes and undermines the public schools and in arguing the value of school choice, had a major impact on the education reform movement. It is regarded as among the most influential and controversial works on education to be published in the last two decades.

In 1992 Moe became a senior fellow at the Hoover Institution, and thereafter held joint appointments in both the Stanford political science department and Hoover. From 2003–07, he served as chair of the political science department. In 2003 he was also awarded the William Bennett Munro Professorship, an endowed chair in political science.

In his 2016 book, Relic: How Our Constitution Undermines Effective Government--and Why We Need a More Powerful Presidency'', co-authored with William G. Howell, Moe argues for constitutional reform.

Publications

Selected books
 Special Interest: Teachers Unions and America’s Public Schools (2011, The Brookings Institution Press)
 Liberating Learning: Technology, Politics, and the Future of American Education (with John Chubb – 2009, Jossey-Bass)
 Schools, Vouchers, and the American Public (2001, The Brookings Institution Press)
 Politics, Markets, and America’s Schools (with John Chubb – 1990, The Brookings Institution Press)
 The Organization of Interests (1980, University of Chicago Press)

Selected political science articles
 “The New Economics of Organization.” 1984. American Journal of Political Science 28 (November): 739–77.
 "The Politicized Presidency." 1985. In The New Direction in American Politics, edited by John E. Chubb and Paul E. Peterson, Washington, D.C.: The Brookings Institution: 235–71.
 “The Politics of Bureaucratic Structure.” 1989. Can the Government Govern?,  edited by John E. Chubb and Paul E. Peterson,  Washington, D.C.: The Brookings Institution: 267–329.
 “Political Institutions: The Neglected Side of the Story." 1990. Journal of Law, Economics, and Organization 6: 213–54. Reprinted in Public Choice Theory, edited by Charles K. Rowley, 1993. Hant, England: Edward Elgar.
 “Presidents, Institutions, and Theory.” 1993. In Researching the Presidency: Vital Questions, New Approaches, edited by George C. Edwards III, John H. Kessel and Bert A. Rockman.  Pittsburgh: University of Pittsburgh Press.
 “The Presidential Power of Unilateral Action.” 1999 (with William Howell). Journal of Law, Economics, and Organization 15 no. 1 (April): 132–79. Reprinted in Public Choice and Public Law, edited by Daniel A. Farber. Northampton, MA: Edward Elgar, 2007.
 “Power and Political Institutions.” 2005. Perspectives on Politics. Vol. 3, No. 2 (June): 215–33.  Reprinted in Rethinking Political Institutions: The Art of the State, edited by Ian Shapiro, Stephen Skowronek and Daniel Galvin. New York: New York University Press, 2006.
 “The Revolution in Presidential Theory.” 2009.  Presidential Studies Quarterly. Vol. 39 No. 3 (December): 701–24.

References

External links

 Faculty Biography at the Hoover Institution 
 Brookings Institution
 Stanford University Faculty Page
 Liberating Learning: Technology, Politics and American Education
 

Stanford University Department of Political Science faculty
University of Minnesota College of Liberal Arts alumni
American political scientists
1949 births
Living people